Hey Jude (original title: The Beatles Again) is a 1970 collection of non-album singles and B-sides by the Beatles. Originally released in the United States and various other markets, but not in the United Kingdom, it consisted of non-album singles and B-sides not previously issued on an American Beatles LP; this included "I Should Have Known Better" and "Can't Buy Me Love", two singles released by Capitol Records whose only previous American album appearance had been on the A Hard Day's Night soundtrack album, which had been released by United Artists Records. The Hey Jude LP has been out of print since the late 1980s, although it remained available on cassette during the 1990s. The album was issued on CD for the first time in 2014, as an individual release and in a box set titled The U.S. Albums.

History
The Hey Jude album was conceived by Allen Klein and Apple Records.  Klein had negotiated a more lucrative contract for the Beatles with Capitol Records in 1969 which required one compilation album per year. He directed Allan Steckler of ABKCO/Apple to work on one.  Steckler chose songs that had not appeared on a Capitol album in the United States and that spanned the group's career. He also focused more on recent singles than on earlier material. The absence of the songs from a US Capitol album was partially due to the Beatles' unwillingness to include single releases on their contemporaneous albums. This was a consequence of their arrangement with United Artists in 1964 and due to the habit of Capitol Records of recompiling the Beatles' British releases for local markets until 1967. Steckler chose not to include the original Parlophone single version of "Love Me Do"; "A Hard Day's Night", which had been released as a single by Capitol and was available on the United Artists soundtrack album; "I'm Down", which was the B-side of "Help!"; and "The Inner Light", the B-side of "Lady Madonna". He also overlooked "From Me to You", "Misery", and "There's a Place", which were first issued in the US by Vee Jay Records but had not yet been issued on a Capitol album. "Sie Liebt Dich", a German-language version of "She Loves You", and the single version of "Get Back" were also passed over. (The single version of "Let It Be" and its B-side, "You Know My Name (Look Up the Number)", had yet to be released.)

Steckler and Apple had become disappointed with the Capitol Records release schedules and determined to promote the new album themselves.  Steckler also took the tapes to Sam Feldman at Bell Sound Studios for mastering, rather than delivering them to Capitol.  He would do this for several releases thereafter.

Originally, the album was to be called The Beatles Again. Shortly before the record was released, however, the title was changed to Hey Jude in order to promote the inclusion of the top-selling song that led off side two. The title change occurred after the record labels were printed, and an untold number of copies of the LP were sold with labels with the title The Beatles Again. This was also true for cassette copies of the album, which retained the original title. Neither the front nor the back of the album jacket displayed the record's title (or the name of the band), but most copies were sold in a jacket whose spine read Hey Jude. In an attempt to clear up any confusion caused by the preprinted labels, initial copies of the album displayed a sticker on the cover bearing the title Hey Jude. The edition of the album with "The Beatles Again" label bore catalogue number SO-385 on the label but not on the jacket. This is because of a similarly timed decision to reduce the price from $6.98 (SO- prefix) to $5.98 (SW- prefix). The record jacket was prepared late enough so that it lists the catalogue number as SW-385. The SW-385 catalogue number appears on the label of later pressings that bear the title Hey Jude on the label.

Klein authorised the release of the album as a sales buffer during post-production of the delayed Let It Be album. In 2007 Neil Aspinall claimed that the back cover was supposed to be the front cover and vice versa but that Klein had reversed them in error. However, at least three prototype cover designs are known to exist, with the earliest of those showing the photos "reversed": the art department seemingly made the determination that the photo that now appears on the front cover was better suited for that purpose. The front and back cover pictures were taken at the last-ever Beatles photo session, on 22 August 1969, at John Lennon's home Tittenhurst Park by Ethan Russel.

Release
The compilation was released in many countries, including the United States, Canada, Australia, Spain, Germany, France, Greece, Japan, Mexico, Venezuela and most of South America.  It was also available to other countries as an "export" from Britain (Parlophone/Apple CPCS-106) but was not at first issued in Britain, although it was a popular import to the UK. The first issue in New Zealand was on the gloss black Apple label with the catalogue number CPCS-106. The matrix numbers were identical to those on the UK "export" issue. Because of its popularity worldwide, EMI issued Hey Jude in Britain on the Parlophone label on 11 May 1979 (catalogue number PCS 7184). Until the release of 1967–1970 in 1973, Hey Jude was the only way to own the extremely popular "Hey Jude" single on LP or in a stereo mix. The songs "Rain", "Lady Madonna" and "Revolution" were also first mixed for stereo specifically for this album. Prior to the release of the "Get Back" single in the spring of 1969, all Beatles singles were issued in mono in the US. Several other countries adopted the original The Beatles Again title. Of these, the Spanish release omitted "The Ballad of John and Yoko", due to that song having been deemed offensive. (In addition to making repeated mention of Christ and crucifixion, the lyrics contain the line "Gibraltar near Spain" at a time when Spain's Franco administration was contending with the UK over the ownership of Gibraltar.)

On the reel-to-reel and cassette tape releases, sides one and two are reversed. Although it is clear on the vinyl version that "Hey Jude" opens side two, when compiling this issue for audio tape, some compilers (at Capitol and Ampex) thought to make the change, which resulted in "Hey Jude" leading off the album.  This was done because side two was the longer side, and it was the practice in some tape formats to lead the album with the longer side to avoid a large gap in the "middle" of the tape.  The four-track tape, prepared by Ampex along with the reel-to-reel tape, has the songs in the original, chronological order. (The eight-track tape was treated to the usual re-ordering that eight-tracks received.)

The CD era saw the standardisation of the Beatles' discographies worldwide, and for many years the Hey Jude album was not available in that format. In January 2014, Hey Jude was issued on CD both individually and in an American Beatles album compilation box set titled The U.S. Albums.

Track listing
All tracks written by Lennon–McCartney, except where noted.

Personnel
The Beatles
John Lennon – lead vocals, backing vocals, rhythm guitar, lead guitar, harmonica, percussion
Paul McCartney – lead vocals, backing vocals, bass guitar, lead guitar, piano, Hammond organ, drums, percussion
George Harrison – lead vocals, backing vocals, lead guitar, rhythm guitar, bass guitar, Hammond organ, percussion
Ringo Starr – backing vocals, drums, percussion

Additional musicians
Nicky Hopkins – electric piano (6)
Billy Preston – electric piano (9)
Ronnie Scott – tenor saxophone (5)
Bill Povey – tenor saxophone (5)
Harry Klein – baritone saxophone (5)
Bill Jackman – baritone saxophone (5)

Charts
In the US, the album sold 2,321,769 copies by 31 December 1970 and 3,264,398 copies by the end of the decade.

Certifications

References

External links

Albums produced by George Martin
The Beatles compilation albums
Capitol Records compilation albums
Apple Records compilation albums
Parlophone compilation albums
Albums recorded at Trident Studios
1970 compilation albums
Albums recorded at Apple Studios